William Urquhart Baird (born 1 October 1874 in Leith) was a Scottish footballer, who played for Dundee, St Bernard's and Scotland.

References

Sources

External links

London Hearts profile

1874 births
Year of death missing
Scottish footballers
Scotland international footballers
Dundee F.C. players
St Bernard's F.C. players
People from Leith
Association football central defenders
Footballers from Edinburgh